Inge Kure (born 7 November 1965) is a former Dutch international cricketer whose career for the Dutch national side spanned from 1985 to 1993. She played in six One Day International (ODI) matches, all of which came at the 1993 World Cup.

A right-arm medium-fast bowler, Kure made her senior debut for the Netherlands in July 1985, when the team toured England. Aged 19 at that time, she did not again appear for the national team until 1992, on another tour of England. The following year, Kure was selected in the Dutch squad for the World Cup in England. She went on to play in six of a possible seven matches, with her debut coming in the tournament opener against Australia. Like the team as a whole, Kure had little success at the tournament – she bowled only sporadically, taking a single wicket from 19.2 overs, and her five innings as a batsman yielded seven runs and three ducks, Her one wicket had come in a rain-restricted match against India, where she had figures of 1/4 from a single over.

References

1965 births
Dutch women cricketers
Living people
Netherlands women One Day International cricketers
Sportspeople from Enschede
20th-century Dutch women
21st-century Dutch women